National Highway 344B, commonly referred to as NH 344B, is a national highway in  India. It is a spur road of National Highway 44. NH-344B traverses the state of Punjab in India.

Route 
Phagwara - Hoshiarpur.

Junctions  

  Terminal near Phagwara.
        Terminal near Phagwara.                             
                Terminal near Hoshiarpur.

See also 

 List of National Highways in India
 List of National Highways in India by state

References

External links 

 NH 344B on OpenStreetMap

National highways in India
National Highways in Punjab, India